Velling Kirkeby is a small town in West Denmark on the peninsula of Jutland with a population of only 259 (1 January 2022). It is positioned next to the Ringkøbing Fjord which, with its shallow waters combined with the stable west wind, is popular with wind and kitesurfers. This town belongs to the Ringkøbing-Skjern Municipality.

The parish church dates to the middle of the 12th century (app. 1150) and is built in the romanesque style. 

Despite the modest size of the town, it has three schools built on the Danish "free school" (friskoleloven) and "public enlightenment" traditions in the parish. The schools are; Velling Friskole, Fjordvang Efterskole and Vestjyllands Højskole.

References

Cities and towns in the Central Denmark Region
Ringkøbing-Skjern Municipality